Pseudobagarius meridionalis is a species of catfish belonging to the family Akysidae (the stream catfishes). It is only known from the Barito River basin in southern Borneo.

This is a very small catfish, up to 32 mm standard length, with a body dark brown above with a few scattered pale spots and white below, with a strongly projected upper jaw so that the premaxillary teeth are clearly visible even when the mouth is closed.

References

Akysidae
Freshwater fish of Indonesia
Fish described in 2004
Endemic fauna of Indonesia
Freshwater fish of Borneo